Paul Reville is a U.S. politician, teacher, school principal, and educational researcher who was the Massachusetts Secretary of Education from 2008 to 2013 under Governor Deval Patrick. He currently serves as the Francis Keppel Professor of Practice of Educational Policy and Administration at the Harvard Graduate School of Education.

Biography

Paul Reville is the Francis Keppel Professor of Practice of Educational Policy and Administration at the Harvard Graduate School of Education (HGSE). He is the founding director of HGSE's EdRedesign Lab. In 2013, he completed nearly five years of service as the Secretary of Education for the Commonwealth of Massachusetts. As Governor Patrick's top education adviser, Reville established a new Executive Office of Education and had oversight of higher education, K-12, and early education in the nation's leading student achievement state. He served in the Governor's Cabinet and played a leading education reform role on matters ranging from the Achievement Gap Act of 2010 and Common Core State Standards to the Commonwealth's highly successful Race to the Top proposal. 

Prior to joining the Patrick Administration, Reville chaired the Massachusetts State Board of Education, founded the Rennie Center for Education Research and Policy, co-founded the Massachusetts Business Alliance for Education (MBAE), chaired the Massachusetts Reform Review Commission, chaired the Massachusetts Commission on Time and Learning, and served as executive director of the Pew Forum on Standards-Based Reform, a national think tank which convened the U.S.'s leading researchers, practitioners, and policymakers to set the national standards agenda. Reville played a central role in MBAE's development of and advocacy for Massachusetts historic Education Reform Act of 1993. Reville has been a member of the HGSE faculty since 1997 and has served as director of the Education Policy and Management Program. 

Reville's career, which combines research, policy, and practice, began with service as a VISTA volunteer/youth worker. He served as a teacher and principal of two urban, alternative high schools. Some years later, he founded a local education foundation which was part of the Public Education Network. He is a board member and adviser to a host of organizations, including BELL, Match Education, Bellwether, City Year Boston, Harvard Medical School's MEDscience and others. He is a frequent writer and speaker on education reform and policy issues. He is also the educator commentator, Boston Public Radio, WGBH. Paul Reville holds a Bachelor of Arts from Colorado College and a Master of Arts from Stanford University, along with five honorary doctorate degrees.

Associations 

 Chair, Massachusetts Board of Education, Commonwealth of Massachusetts,(2002-2008)
 Secretary of Education, Commonwealth of Massachusetts,(2008-2013)
 WGBH, Bi-weekly Commentator, Boston Public Radio
 National Education Association (NEA) Foundation, Senior Fellow
 Boston Public Schools Superintendent Tommy Chang's Transition Team, Member
 Massachusetts Foundation Budget Review Commission, Gubernatorial Appointee
 Bellwether, Board of Directors, Member
 BELL, Chair, Massachusetts Leadership Council
 Rennie Center for Research and Policy, Board Member
 MedScience, Harvard Medical School, Board Chair
 Boston After School and Beyond, Board Member
 PEAR, Harvard Medical School, National Advisory Council, Member
 Massachusetts Business Alliance for Education, Honorary Board Member
 National Center on Time and Learning, Chair, National Advisory Council
 Wheelock College, Corporator
 Debate Mate, Board Member
 Massachusetts Department of Elementary & Secondary Education and the Institute of Research, Advisory Committee on District & School Accountability
 College for Social Innovation, Advisory Board
 Enterprise Cities, Babson Global Inc., Academic Advisory Council, Member
 New Profit, Reimagine Education, Domain Member

Criticism

During his tenure as Massachusetts Secretary of Education, Reville faced calls for resignation over his promotion of charter schools.</ref> By contrast, Reville himself has criticized the prevalence of for-profit charter schools in Michigan in 2016.

Recent Publications

Reville, P. and Sacks, L. (2021). Collaborative Action for Equity and Opportunity A Practical Guide for School and Community Leaders. Harvard Education Publishing: Cambridge, MA.,(2021)

Reville, P. (2021, April 26). Pandemic learning loss can be a post-pandemic opportunity for education reforms. Boston Globe. 

Reville, P. and King, J. B. Jr. (2021, March 5). Ed Week This Could Be the Moment to Help the Poorest Among Us: Our Nation’s Children. Education Week. 

Reville, P. (2020, March 27). The Urgent Need For Children’s Cabinets. Usable Knowledge. 

Reville, P. (2020, April 8). Reville: Beyond The Coronavirus Shutdown, An Opportunity For A Whole-child Paradigm Shift. The 74 Million. 

Reville, P. (2020, April 9). Coronavirus Gives Us An Opportunity To Rethink K-12 Education. Boston Globe. 

Reville, P. (2020, Aug. 30). Pods could become tipping point in education. CommonWealth Magazine. 

Reville, P. (2020, Sept. 15). Reville: In This Uncertain Time, Every Student Needs an Education Navigator and a Success Plan to Weather This Crisis and Fix Long-standing Inequities. The 74 Million. 

Reville, P. (2019, August 24). My Turn: Paul Reville: Lessons for fixing schools. Providence Journal. 

Reville, P. (2019, August 15). The huge thing school reformers have ignored — by a school reformer. Washington Post. 

Reville, P. (2020, July 27). Thriving Together: A Springboard for Equitable Recovery and Resilience in Communities Across America. 

Reville, P. (2020, May 21). Schools Are Socially Promoting Students En Masse. What Comes Next? Ed Week. 

Reville, P. and Weiss, E. (2019). Broader, Bolder, Better: How Schools and Communities Help Students Overcome the Disadvantages of Poverty. Harvard Education Press: Cambridge, MA.,(2019)

Reville, P. (2019, April 4). Reville: New Harvard Report Recommends Creating a Personalized 'Support Plan' for Every Child. Here Are 5 Places to Start. The 74 Million. 

Reville, P. (2018, June 11). Reville: 9 Places Where Communities & Families Are Working Together in a New Social Compact for Student Success. The 74 Million. 

Reville, P. (2018, July 28). For Teachers' Unions to Survive, It's Time to Go Positive for Students. Education Week. 

Reville, P., and Sacks, L. (2018, October 2). Sustaining Collaborative Action. Stanford Social Innovation Review. 

Reville, P. (2017, November 27). Instruction alone is not enough to help all students succeed. Scholastic. 

Reville, P. (2017, January 17). The Next Chapter of Educational Reform: Building a New Human Capital Engine. Federal Reserve Bank of Boston Communities and Banking. 

Reville, P. (2017, February 8). The elusive quest for equity and excellence in US school reform. Nature Human Behaviour, 1 (2). 

Reville, P. (2017, August 10). Summer enrichment for kids for all kids. Providence Journal. 

Reville, P. (2016, March 25). Third Semester: A Point of Privilege. Real Clear Education.,(2016)

Reville, P. (2016, March 14). End the charter school wars. A new path forward can be good for charter and district schools. Commonwealth Magazine. 

Reville, P. (2016, October 11). An Urgent Call to Action for Education Leaders Fixing the 'disillusionment' in education reform. Education Week, 36 (08), 22-23. 

Reville, P. (2016, Nov. 9). What the Trump presidency will mean for schools. TES. 

Ladd. H., Noguera, P., Reville, P., & Starr, J. (2016, April 15). Why This is Our Education Policy Moment. Education Week, Op-Ed.,(2016)

Reville, P. (2016, November 24). Betsy DeVos: a fierce advocate for choice who will face a fight with Congress and unions to push through reform. Times Education Supplement. 

Reville, P. (2015, March 18). How to get world-class leaders for world-class schools. The Boston Globe.,(2015)

Reville, Paul. (2015). The Journey Toward Equity and Excellence: The Massachusetts Experience. In A. M. Blankstein Editor & P. Noguera Editor (Eds.), Excellence Through Equity (pp. 185-201). Thousand Oaks, CA: Corwin.,(2015)

Reville, P. (2015, July 7). Why We Fail to Address the Achievement Gap. Education Week, 34(36), 22-23.,(2015)

Reville, P. (2015, January 20). The next steps in education reform. Once again, we need to ask: What more needs to be done? The Boston Globe.,(2015)

Reville, P. (2014). How to create a new k-12 engine. Education Week, 33(29), 24 & 28.,(2014)

Reville, P. (2013, June 10). Accelerate progress on education. The Boston Globe.,(2013)

Reville, P. (2013, October 24). From the stands, a lesson in sportsmanship. Cognoscenti.,(2013)

Pazzanese, C. (2013, November 22). Core objectives: Potential in new k-12 benchmarks mightier than challenges, says Reville of HGSE. Harvard Gazette.,(2013)

Tanden, N., & Reville, P. (2013, December 4). Taking a page from the bay state’s education playbook. U.S. News & World Report.,(2013)

Reville, P. (2013). Seize the moment to design schools that close gaps. Education Week, 32(33), 36.,(2013)

Reville, S. P. (2012, April/May). Gateway cities education agenda update. Worcester Telegram & Gazette.,(2012)

Reville, P. (2012, January 3). Poverty perspectives: A new educational delivery system for success. Spotlight on Poverty and Opportunity.,(2012)

Henig, J., Malone, H. J., & Reville, P. (2012). Addressing the disadvantages of poverty: Why ignore the most important challenge of the post-standards era? In J. Mehta, R. J. Schwartz, & F. M. Hess (Eds.), The futures of school reform (pp. 119-149). Cambridge, MA: Harvard Education Press.,(2012)

Reville, P. (2008). Chapter 3: A mountain beyond mountains. In S. Redding, & H. J. Wahlberg (Eds.), Handbook on statewide systems of support (pp. 15-18). Charlotte, NC: Information Age Publishing.,(2008)

External links

 Profile of Paul Reville on the website of Harvard Graduate School of Education
 Profile of Paul Reville on the website of The EdRedesign Lab

State cabinet secretaries of Massachusetts
Harvard Graduate School of Education faculty
Educators from Massachusetts
Living people
Year of birth missing (living people)